Degahi (also Romanized as Degāhī; also known as Dagah, Dagāh, Dakāh, Degā, Degakh, and Deqeh) is a village in Taham Rural District, in the Central District of Zanjan County, Zanjan Province, Iran. At the 2006 census, its population was 150, in 35 families.

References 

Populated places in Zanjan County